Bulletproof is a British police procedural series, created by and starring Noel Clarke and Ashley Walters, that first broadcast on Sky One on 15 May 2018. Produced by Vertigo Films and Company Pictures, the series follows NCA detectives, and best friends, Aaron Bishop (Clarke) and Ronnie Pike Jr. (Walters), who investigate some of the country's most dangerous criminals, including traffickers, drug dealers and armed robbers, whilst being overseen by their boss Sarah Tanner (Lindsey Coulson).

The series was co-created and principally written by scriptwriter and director Nick Love, who was approached by Sky to work on the series following his work on the 2012 remake of The Sweeney. Walters and Clarke commented to Deadline Hollywood that the series was inspired by films such as Lethal Weapon and Bad Boys, quoting that "the humour and funny moments come from the relationships between the characters." The series' opening theme, "All Goes Wrong", was also personally chosen by Clarke and Walters. The complete series was released on DVD on 23 July 2018. Worldwide distribution is handled by Sky Vision.

On 19 June 2018, the day of the series one finale, a second series consisting of seven episodes was confirmed. Sky TV announced in December 2019 that the second series would air on 20 March 2020. Further, in August 2019 it was announced that a new three-part special would be broadcast in Autumn 2020. The special began airing on 20 January 2021, with all episodes released for on-demand viewing. It sees Bishop and Pike journeying to South Africa to investigate the country's criminal underworld.

On 15 January 2021, five days before the third series premiered, Bulletproof was renewed for a fourth series. The series was set to consist of eight episodes; filming had been scheduled to begin later in the year. However, following allegations against Clarke in late April 2021 of sexual misconduct and bullying, filming was suspended, and makers Vertigo said they would investigate whether any of the allegations related to their productions. In May 2021, the series was officially cancelled by Sky One.

Synopsis
Aaron Bishop (Noel Clarke) and Ronnie Pike (Ashley Walters) are childhood friends, albeit from very different backgrounds. Ronnie is from a high-achieving middle-class family with a history in the police, with his father now working as Director-General of the National Crime Agency. Bishop, however, grew up in foster homes and on the streets. Despite their differences, they retain a close fraternal bond and work together as detectives for the National Crime Agency in London, dealing with serious organised crime.

Cast

Main
 Noel Clarke as Aaron "Bish" Bishop; an NCA Detective Inspector
 Ashley Walters as Ronald "Ronnie" Pike Jr; an NCA Detective Inspector
 Lindsey Coulson as Sarah Tanner; an NCA Detective Chief Inspector
 Jason Maza as Chris Munroe; an NCA Detective Sergeant
 David Elliot as Tim "Jonesy" Jones; an NCA Detective Sergeant (series 1–2)
 Christina Chong as Nell McBride; an NCA Detective Sergeant (series 1)
 Mandeep Dhillon as Kamali Khan; an NCA Detective Constable (series 1)
 Olivia Chenery as Scarlett 'Scooch' Hailton; an NCA Detective Inspector (series 2–3)
 Lucie Shorthouse as Paige Pennington; an NCA Detective Constable (series 2–3)
 Clarke Peters as Ronald Pike Sr; Pike's father and the Director-General of the National Crime Agency (series 1)
 Lee Ross as Richard Cockridge; Deputy Director of the NCA (series 2)
 Lashana Lynch (series 1) / Vanessa Vanderpuye (series 2–3) as Arjana Pike; Ronnie's solicitor wife
 Jodie Campbell as Ali Pike; Ronnie and Arjana's oldest daughter
 Florisa Kamara as Donna Pike; Ronnie and Arjana's youngest daughter
David Chabeaux as Kev; an NCA Detective Constable (series 1)

Recurring
 Caroline Goodall as Charlotte Carmel; Deputy Mayor of London (series 1)
 Emma Rigby as Dr. Sophie Latimer; Bishop's girlfriend (series 1)
 Gala Gordon as Anna Markides (series 2)
 Stavros Zalmas as Alex Markides (series 2)
 Ben Tavassoli as Mikey Markides (series 2)
 Gina Bellman as Eleanor Markides (series 2)

Episodes

Series 1 (2018)

Series 2 (2020)

Series 3 (2021)

International broadcast
Bulletproof premiered in the US on The CW in August 2019. The series returned to the network for the second season in June 2020, and then the following year for the third season in March 2021. The series was pulled from the network's streaming and on-demand platforms on 30 April 2021 after the allegations against Clarke were revealed.

In Australia, the series premiered on Foxtel on 1 September 2019.

In Canada, the series premiered on Showcase on 30 September 2020.

Bulletproof: The Interrogation
On 3 April 2020, Sky TV released Bulletproof: The Interrogation, an interactive film in which Clarke and Walters reprise their roles from the original series. Created through Charisma.ai software, the viewer is able to interact with multiple characters through typing and using their microphone. The aim of the film is to try and prevent a captured serial killer from killing his next victim.

References

External links
 
 

2018 British television series debuts
2021 British television series endings
2010s British crime drama television series
2010s British police procedural television series
2010s British comedy-drama television series
2020s British police procedural television series
2020s British crime drama television series
2020s British comedy-drama television series
Sky UK original programming
Television series by All3Media
English-language television shows
Television shows set in England
Television shows shot in Liverpool